Table Tennis at the 2006 Commonwealth Games was held at the Melbourne Sports and Aquatic Centre (MSAC) during March 16–26.

Medal count

Medallists

Results

Men's singles

Bronze play off - Toriola bt Robertson 7-11, 11-3, 11-8, 8-11, 4-11, 11-9, 11-4

Women's singles

Men's doubles

Women's doubles

Mixed doubles

Men's team
Pool A

Pool B

Pool C

Pool D

Final Rounds

Gold medal match

Bronze medal match

Women's team
Pool A

Pool B

Pool C

Final Rounds

Gold medal match

Bronze medal match

See also
 Table tennis at the Commonwealth Games
 Commonwealth Table Tennis Championships

References

2006 Commonwealth Games events
Commonwealth Games
2006
Table tennis competitions in Australia